The Concordat of 2004 was an agreement between Portugal and the Holy See of the Roman Catholic Church. The concordat was signed on 18 May 2004 by Angelo Sodano, Cardinal Secretary of State, for the Holy See and José Manuel Durão Barroso, Prime Minister of Portugal, for the Portuguese Republic. It has 33 articles, and supersedes the Concordat of 1940, renewing the relations between the Catholic Church and Portugal, redefining the status of this religion in the Portugal. Articles refer to aspects like religious holidays, religious marriage, organization of the Church, fiscal rights, freedom of cult and schools.

External links
Concordat Watch - Portugal (includes full text of Concordat)

Catholic Church in Portugal
2004
2004 in Portugal
21st century in Portugal
Treaties concluded in 2004
Treaties of Portugal
Holy See–Portugal relations